Adamsville is an unincorporated community located in Sumter County, Florida, United States. The community is served by the 34785 ZIP Code.

Geography 
Adamsville is bordered by Coleman to the west; Lake County to the east; Wildwood to the north, and Sumterville to the south.

Education
The community of Adamsville is served by Sumter County Schools, which serves the entire county.

References

External links
Adamsville page from Hometown Locator

Unincorporated communities in Sumter County, Florida
Unincorporated communities in Florida
Former county seats in Florida